Wilhelm von Tangen Hansteen  (11 May 1896 – 6 September 1980) was a Norwegian Army officer.

Biography
Hansteen was born in Kristiania (now Oslo), Norway. He was the son of Axel August Hansteen (1863-1937) and Lina von Tangen (1870-1954). He was educated at the War College (1917) and the Norwegian Military Academy (1919).  From 1937 to 1941, Hansteen served as the Norwegian military attaché to Helsinki. In this position he worked for stronger Norwegian support for Finland during the Winter War.

After a short period in Stockholm, he was in 1942 promoted directly from Major to Major General and appointed Commander in Chief of the Norwegian Armed Forces. He held this position until 1944 when then-Crown Prince Olav was made Commander in Chief. Hansteen served as Deputy Commander for the rest of World War II.

Hansteen continued his distinguished military career after the war, serving as commander of the Norwegian forces in Germany from 1946, as commander of the Norwegian Army from 1948, and as commander of NATO forces in Norway from 1951. He retired from the army in 1966 and died during 1980 in Oslo. Hansteen was the commander of the Order of St. Olav  and Knight Commander of the British Order of the Bath, Commander of the French Legion of Honour.

References

Other sources
Charles D. Pettibone (2014) The Organization and Order of Battle of Militaries In World War II	(Trafford Publishing) 

1896 births
1980 deaths
Military personnel from Oslo
Norwegian Military Academy alumni
Norwegian Army World War II generals
Chiefs of Defence (Norway)
Norwegian military attachés
Recipients of the Legion of Honour
Knights Commander of the Order of the Bath
Recipients of the St. Olav's Medal